Sadatabad may refer to:
 Sadatabad, Eqlid, Fars Province
 Sadatabad, Shiraz, Fars Province
 Sadatabad, Hamadan
 Sadatabad, Isfahan
 Sadatabad, Kohgiluyeh and Boyer-Ahmad
 Sadatabad-e Lishtar, Kohgiluyeh and Boyer-Ahmad Province

See also
 Saadatabad (disambiguation)